The 2014–15 Surinamese Hoofdklasse is the 82nd season of the SVB Hoofdklasse, the highest football league competition of Suriname. The season began in October 2014, and will finish in June 2015.

Changes from 2013–14 

 Robinhood was relegated to the SVB Eerste Klasse; it was the first time Robinhood will be playing outside of the top division since 1948
 Botapaise was promoted to the Hoofdklasse, replacing relegated Robinhood

League table

Relegation playoffs 

The team which finishes 9th, will face the 2nd-placed 2014–15 SVB Eerste Klasse side for a two-legged play-off. The winner on aggregate score after both matches earns entry into the 2015–16 SVB Hoofdklasse. SV Robinhood defeated Boma Star in the two legged series.

First leg

Second leg 

Robinhood won 6–4 on aggregate.

References 

SVB Eerste Divisie seasons
1
Surinam